Plagiolirion is a genus of Colombian plants in the  Amaryllis family. It contains only one known species, Plagiolirion horsmannii, rare in the wild and for several years thought extinct until rediscovered in the Río Cauca Valley in 1989. It has showy, white flowers.

References

Monotypic Amaryllidaceae genera
Endemic flora of Colombia
Taxa named by John Gilbert Baker